Coundon Gate (also known as Coundongate) is a small village in County Durham, in England.
 It is situated between Bishop Auckland and Coundon.

References

Villages in County Durham